Falukorv is a Swedish sausage (korv in Swedish) made of a grated mixture of smoked pork and beef or veal with potato starch flour, onion, salt and mild spices. Falukorv is a cooked sausage, so it can be eaten without any further preparation.

History
The history of falukorv reaches back to the Falun copper mine during the 16th and 17th century, where ox hide was used for ropes and some of the meat remaining after slaughter was salted and smoked and used for sausages.

The tradition of preparing the meat in this way was revitalised in the late 19th century by the butcher Anders Olsson, whose initiation led to the development of the modern falukorv, which uses a mixture of pork and beef or veal.

Variants

TSG falukorv 
A popular sausage, falukorv has Traditional Speciality Guaranteed-status in the EU and UK. Under EU law thus, restrictions apply to what may be labeled as "falukorv". Only potato flour may be used as a binding agent, and the amount of meat may not fall short of 45%, although most brands of falukorv have a significantly higher meat percentage.

Middagskorv 
Because of its TSG status, only that particular sausage may be called falukorv; it may not be made with alternative ingredients. Manufacturers therefore use the term middagskorv (dinner sausage) to describe variations, such as sausages with a lower fat content of 9% instead of the standard 23%, chicken,  or vegetarian versions made from soy, pea and potato protein or quorn.

Typical falukorv meals
 Sliced and fried with boiled, fried, or mashed potato
 Sliced and fried with elbow macaroni
 Sliced and fried, served with baked Swedish brown beans and fried egg
 Partially sliced and baked au gratin with cheese and mustard, often with onion or apple tucked in between the slices; served accompanied by roast or mashed potatoes.
 As a substitute for the beef in beef stroganoff – the resulting dish being known as korv stroganoff
 Diced and fried with potatoes and onions as a component of pyttipanna

See also
Leberkäse

References

EC PDO/PGI/TSG Food List

Swedish sausages
Dalarna
Traditional Speciality Guaranteed products from Sweden
Cooked sausages